

Gmina Rudka  is a rural gmina (Polish:gmina wiejska) in Bielsk County, Podlaskie Voivodeship. It is located in north-eastern Poland.

Geography 
Gmina Rudka is located in the geographical region of Europe known as the Wysoczyzny Podlasko – Bialoruskie (English: Podlaskie and Belarus Plateau) and the mezoregion known as the Równina Bielska (English: Bielska Plain).

Location 
It is located approximately: 
  north-east of Warsaw, the capital of Poland
  south-west of Białystok, the capital of the Podlaskie Voivodeship
  west of Bielsk Podlaski, the seat of Bielsk County

Climate 
The region has a continental climate which is characterized by high temperatures during summer and long and frosty winters . The average amount of rainfall during the year exceeds .

Rivers 
Two rivers pass through the Gmina:
 The Nurzec River, a tributary of the Bug River
 The Siennica River, a tributary of the Nurzec River

Demographics 
Detailed data as of 31 December 2007:

Municipal government 

Its seat is the village of Rudka.

Executive branch 
The chief executive of the government is the mayor (Polish: wójt).

Legislative branch 
The legislative portion of the government is the Council (Polish: Rada) comprising the President (Polish: Przewodniczący), the Vice-President (Polish: Wiceprzewodniczący) and thirteen councilors.

Villages 
The following villages are contained within the gmina:

Józefin, Karp, Koce Borowe, Niemyje-Jarnąty, Niemyje-Skłody, Niemyje-Ząbki, Nowe Niemyje, Rudka, Stare Niemyje.

Neighbouring political subdivisions 
Gmina Rudka is bordered by the town of Brańsk and by the Gminy of Brańsk, Ciechanowiec, Grodzisk and Klukowo.

Transport

Roads and highways 
A Voivodeship Road passes through Gmina Rudka:

 Voivodeship Road 681  - Roszki-Wodźki - Łapy - Brańsk - Rudka - Ciechanowiec

Local attractions 
 Ossoliński Palace - eighteenth century baroque architecture. Built in 1763, rebuilt in the years 1913-1914, the so-called 'New palace " of about 1930. Orangery brick from the second half of the eighteenth century, brick and wood buildings and czworaki from the nineteenth and twentieth in, park, 1763;

Nearby attractions 

References 

Rudka
Bielsk County